Billingstown is an unincorporated community in Williams County, in the U.S. state of Ohio.

History
The community was named for William Billings, an early settler.

References

Unincorporated communities in Williams County, Ohio
Unincorporated communities in Ohio